Baildon is an unincorporated community in Baildon Rural Municipality No. 131, Saskatchewan, Canada. It is located 10 km south of the city of Moose Jaw, about 5 km east of Highway 2 on Township road 154.

See also 
 List of communities in Saskatchewan

References 

Baildon No. 131, Saskatchewan
Ghost towns in Saskatchewan
Unincorporated communities in Saskatchewan
Division No. 7, Saskatchewan